John Baxter (died c. 1611) was an English lawyer and politician who sat in the House of Commons between 1601 and 1611.

Baxter may have been the son of Henry Baxter of Cannock, Staffordshire. He studied for the law entering either Gray's Inn in 1565 or Middle Temple from New Inn in 1568. He was called to the bar in 1585. He became gaoler for Derbyshire in 1588 and was steward of Derby in 1599. In 1601, he was elected Member of Parliament for Derby. He was re-elected MP for Derby in 1604. He was clerk of the peace for Derbyshire by 1606. 
 
Baxter died by May 1611 when a replacement was sought for his position as clerk.

References

Year of birth missing
1611 deaths
16th-century births
English MPs 1601
English MPs 1604–1611